Henry Elwin (born 29 April 1943) is a Dominican cricketer. He played in eight first-class matches for the Windward Islands from 1964 to 1967.

See also
 List of Windward Islands first-class cricketers

References

External links
 

1943 births
Living people
Dominica cricketers
Windward Islands cricketers